The Model 15 is a music synth and an educational tool mobile app designed for iPad, iPhone and iPod Touch. It is a software recreation of a Model 15 modular synth from 1973.

Features
 Monophonic and 4-voice polyphony
 Over 160 sounds
 3D touch
  Ableton link
 Tutorial patches for beginners
 Expressive sequencing arpeggiator
 Inter-app audio and audio bus

See also 

 Moog synthesizer
 Animoog

References

External links
 

Moog synthesizers
IOS software
Software synthesizers